Darts Are Trumps is a 1938 British comedy film directed by Maclean Rogers and starring Eliot Makeham, Nancy O'Neil and Ian Colin. A darts player manages to thwart a jewel thief.

It was made at Walton Studios as a quota quickie for release by RKO Pictures.

Cast
 Eliot Makeham as Joe Stone 
 Nancy O'Neil as Mary Drake 
 Ian Colin as Harry 
 Muriel George as Mrs. Drake 
 H. F. Maltby as Stephen Sims 
 Paul Blake as Hon. Bernard Jaye 
 John Singer as Jimmy

References

Bibliography
 Chibnall, Steve. Quota Quickies: The Birth of the British 'B' Film. British Film Institute, 2007.
 Low, Rachael. Filmmaking in 1930s Britain. George Allen & Unwin, 1985.
 Wood, Linda. British Films, 1927-1939. British Film Institute, 1986.

External links

1938 films
British comedy films
1938 comedy films
Films directed by Maclean Rogers
Quota quickies
Films shot at Nettlefold Studios
Films set in England
RKO Pictures films
British black-and-white films
1930s English-language films
1930s British films